Gymnoscelis protracta is a moth in the family Geometridae. It was described by Louis Beethoven Prout in 1958. It is endemic to Malaysia.

References

Moths described in 1958
protracta
Endemic fauna of Malaysia